Irakli Abuseridze (born November 25, 1977 in Tbilisi) is a Georgian rugby union player who plays as a scrum-half. Abuseridze is the most capped player of all time for the Georgia national rugby union team.

Career
Abuseridze made his international debut for Georgia aged 22 against Italy XV in 2000. He has gone on to become a stalwart of the national team and played in all three of Georgia's World Cup appearances in 2003, 2007 and 2011, and has captained the side since 2008 taking over from Ilia Zedginidze.

At club level Abuseridze played with Aurillac in Pro D2 for three years between 2003 and 2006, reaching the Pro De semi finals with them in 2005. He moved down to Fédérale 1 to play for another three years with Orléans. In 2009 he again moved down a division to play in Fédérale 2 with Auxerre as a player/coach.

At national level Abuseridze was the first ever Georgian to reach 80 caps and held the record for most caps for Georgia with 85 before Merab Kvirikashvili superseded him. He is the third most capped player of all time outside the Tier 1 nations. He has scored 8 tries, 40 points on aggregate. He was called for the 2007 Rugby World Cup and the 2011 Rugby World Cup.

References

Irakli Abuseridze statistics

1977 births
Living people
Rugby union players from Georgia (country)
Rugby union scrum-halves
Expatriate rugby union players from Georgia (country)
Expatriate rugby union players in France
Expatriate sportspeople from Georgia (country) in France
Georgia international rugby union players